Rudbar Dasht (also Romanized as Rūdbār Dasht) is a village in Bala Khiyaban-e Litkuh Rural District, in the Central District of Amol County, Mazandaran Province, Iran. At the 2006 census, its population was 650, in 157 families.

References 

Populated places in Amol County